This article lists the full results for group stage of 2020 European Men's Team Badminton Championships. All times are Central European Time (UTC+01:00).

Group 1

Denmark vs. Wales

Latvia vs. Switzerland

Denmark vs. Latvia

Wales vs. Switzerland

Denmark vs. Switzerland

Wales vs. Latvia

Group 2

England vs. Estonia

Greenland vs. Sweden

England vs. Greenland

Estonia vs. Sweden

England vs. Sweden

Estonia vs. Greenland

Group 3

France vs. Hungary

Turkey vs. Belgium

France vs. Turkey

Hungary vs. Belgium

France vs. Belgium

Hungary vs. Turkey

Group 4

Russia vs. Austria

Ireland vs. Poland

Russia vs. Ireland

Austria vs. Poland

Russia vs. Poland

Austria vs. Ireland

Group 5

Germany vs. Czech Republic

Azerbaijan vs. Iceland

Germany vs. Azerbaijan

Czech Republic vs. Iceland

Germany vs. Iceland

Czech Republic vs. Azerbaijan

Group 6

Netherlands vs. Slovakia

Luxembourg vs. Lithuania

Netherlands vs. Luxembourg

Slovakia vs. Lithuania

Netherlands vs. Lithuania

Slovakia vs. Luxembourg

Group 7

Portugal vs. Norway

Slovenia vs. Ukraine

Slovenia vs. Norway

Finland vs. Ukraine

Finland vs. Norway

Slovenia vs. Portugal

Finland vs. Portugal

Norway vs. Ukraine

Finland vs. Slovenia

Portugal vs. Ukraine

Group 8

Bulgaria vs. Croatia

Italy vs. Israel

Spain vs. Croatia

Bulgaria vs. Israel

Spain vs. Israel

Bulgaria vs. Italy

Spain vs. Italy

Israel vs. Croatia

Spain vs. Bulgaria

Italy vs. Croatia

References

2020 European Men's and Women's Team Badminton Championships